Big Island is a small, uninhabited island located in Hudson Bay near the community of Puvirnituq, Quebec, Canada. The island, one of three islands named "Big Island" in the Qikiqtaaluk Region of Nunavut, is part of the Arctic Archipelago.

References

External links 
 Big Island in the Atlas of Canada - Toporama; Natural Resources Canada

Islands of Hudson Bay
Uninhabited islands of Qikiqtaaluk Region